This is an alphabetical list of castles in Lebanon.

Beaufort Castle, Lebanon
Belhacem
Byblos Castle
Scandelion Castle or Kherbet Iskandaroûna in Chamaa
Citadel of Raymond de Saint-Gilles or Tripoli Castle
Deir Kifa Castle
Doubiye Castle
Gibelacar
Hasbaya Castle
Iaal Castle
Lion Tower
Moinetre
Moussa Castle
Mseilha Fort
Saint Louis Castle or Qalaat Al Muizz
Sidon Sea Castle
Smar Jbeil
Toron

See also

List of castles
List of Crusader castles

 
Lebanon
Castles
Lists of castles by country
Castles